Enel may refer to:

 Enel, an Italian electricity company
 Enel Green Power, a renewable energy corporation, subsidiary of Enel
 Enel (One Piece), a fictional villain in the One Piece manga and anime series
 Enel, meaning third in the fiction of J. R. R. Tolkien, cf. Awakening of the Elves
 Enel Brindisi